Romanian humour, like many other Romanian cultural aspects, has many affinities with four other groups: the Latins (namely the French and Italians), the Balkan people (Greeks, the Slavs, and Turks), the Germans and the Hungarians.

Characters

The earliest Romanian character found in anecdotes is Păcală. His name is derived from a (se) păcăli ('to fool oneself/somebody') and, since this word cannot be found in any other related language, we can safely assume that his name is part of the pure Romanian humour.

The Ottoman influence brought the Balkan spirit and with it, other characters and situations. Anton Pann's character, Nastratin Hogea, is a classic example of an urban tradesman. As Jewish people settled in many Romanian regions, two other characters joined Romanian humour: Iţic and Ştrul, a pair of cunning Jews, mainly seen as ingenious, but avaricious shopkeepers.

With modernization and urbanization, especially during the Communist regime, Romanians needed a new character, different from the traditional Păcală, and he was found in Bulă, the tragicomic absolute idiot. In 2006 Bulă was voted the 59th greatest Romanian.

With the fall of communism and facing capitalism, a new kind of joke became popular: that of Alinuţa, a sadistic and stupid 10-year-old girl. Example: Alinuţa: "Mum, I don't like grandma." Mum: "Shut up, we eat what we have!"

Other popular characters are Ion and Maria, a pair of young married or engaged innocent peasants, sometimes depicted as gypsies. Almost all jokes including them are sexually oriented.
Another well-known character is Badea Gheorghe, mainly depicted as an old shepherd with a very simplistic view of life, death and material possessions.
The newest character is Dorel, the archetype of a careless construction worker, engineer or electrician. Originally the name of a clumsy and ill-experienced worker from a series of TV adverts,  Dorel is often depicted as the sole author of weird construction works as door-less balconies or even stairs leading to nowhere or as the cause of blunders leading to comic incidents.

Ethnic jokes

Gypsies
Jokes about  Ţigani (Gypsy) ethnic minority in Romania. Recurring themes are: stealing, refusing to work, having too many children, atrocious personal hygiene and bad personal finance management – essentially, the major stereotypes about Roma in Romania.

Romanians
A common joke about Romanian people is that they tend to be very gullible.

Scotsmen
Scotsmen are presented as stingy, mean, dumb and feisty kilt-wearing skulks, who act against common sense just to save a small amount of money.

Russians
In Romanian humour, Russians are usually depicted as heavy drinkers with a particular fondness for vodka.

A poor Russian fisherman catches a little fish which grants him three wishes. The first wish was "A big vodka". The wish is granted and the fisherman drinks it, then asks the fish for another one. "I want that the whole Volga to be made out of vodka." The wish is granted and the fisherman swims in it and drinks from it. Afterward he is asked for the last wish. He says "You know what? I want another vodka".

Somalis and Ethiopians
Somalis are seen as underweight and hungry.

Q: In what part of Somalia is the density of population greatest?
A: It depends on the direction of the wind.

Albanians
Albanians are portrayed as very technologically impaired.

Q: How can you stop an Albanian tank?
A: You shoot the soldier that is pushing it.

Q: Why is there a rubber-band shortage in Albania?
A: They're saving them for their satellite launch.

Hungarians
Hungarians are seen as proud, but naive. The stereotypical Hungarian is called Janos and usually is accompanied by a Romanian named Ion.
The Cluj local administration discusses the setting up of a statue of Avram Iancu. A councilor says "The statue should have a hand pointing to Hungary, so the Hungarians would know we're watching them". Another one suggests that "in one hand, Iancu should hold a noose, so they would know what to expect should they try to steal Transylvania". Another councilor suggests that "there should be a Hungarian in the noose". Then, Gheorghe Funar (the well-known nationalist former Mayor of Cluj) says "I say we replace the Hungarian every day!".

Regions of Romania
One feature of Romanian humour is that, apart from the ethnic jokes, there are also jokes about people of different regions. They are usually told by using archetypical or cliché expressions and dialect terms typical for the region. For instance Moldavians pronounce /tʃ/ as /ʃ/ and /e/ as /i/, Oltenians make use of the perfect simple (rarely used in other regions) and the Transylvanians use some words of Hungarian and German origin such as 'musai' (meaning must) or 'fain' (meaning nice), and start every other sentence with the interjection "No" (not as a negative answer, which would be nu, but meaning So or Well).
 Oltenians (Olteni) and Muntenians (Munteni) are seen as trying to be ingenious and fast-paced, but failing every time. They do talk a lot too – people from other regions think that they even talk before thinking. Oltenians are said to be especially proud. Nea Mărin is a character created in the 1970s by Amza Pellea (himself an Oltenian), who is the archetypal traditional Oltenian.
 Moldavians (Moldoveni) are witty and proud, and  drink a lot.
 Transylvanians (Ardeleni) are seen as patriarchal and slow, both in thinking, speaking, and in acting.

Stereotypes

Policemen: Most Romanian people are not fond of the law enforcement institutions and try to avoid contact with constables. Romanian public opinion about policemen says that they are primitive, uneducated and totally corrupt. Some of these police jokes belong to the absurd genre.

 Q: A policeman is shaving. The telephone rings. Why does he cut himself?
 A: To know where to resume from.

 Q: How do you choose a stupid policeman from a group of policemen?
 A: At random.

Politics

Especially during the communist regime, political jokes were very popular, although they were illegal and dangerous to tell. In the democratic Romania, these jokes are still popular, although the themes changed: now the politicians are seen either, as hopelessly corrupt, greedy, or as nationalist madmen.

As Ben Lewis put it in his essay, "Communism was a humor-producing machine. Its economic theories and system of repression created inherently funny situations. There were jokes under fascism and Nazism too, but those systems did not create an absurd, laugh-a-minute reality like communism."

 In Ceaușescu's time, a line is forming around the street's corner. A man passing by sees it and asks the last one in line: "What do they sell here?" "I have no idea", he replies, "go ask someone ahead". The man goes to the middle of the line and asks another person: "What do they sell here?" "I have no idea", the answer comes and he is sent farther ahead to seek for an answer. The man goes straight to the first person in line and asks him: "What do they sell here?" The other one answers: "Nothing, I just felt sick and took support on this wall." "Well then, why are you still here?", the man asked. "Because I've never been the first in such a long line", the answer came.

 Bill Clinton, Boris Yeltsin and Ion Iliescu are invited to see an airplane built entirely out of gold. They are told that they can enter it and look around for as long as they like, but they can't take anything. Clinton goes first, stays five minutes, upon his exit the metal detector blares; Clinton had taken a screw and a nail with him. Yeltsin goes second, stays five minutes, upon his exit the metal detector blares again; Yeltsin had stolen a fistful of screws. Finally, Iliescu enters the plane, and stays there five minutes. And another five minutes. And another... Suddenly, the plane takes off.

Radio Yerevan: just like in the most countries of the former Eastern bloc, Radio Yerevan jokes were popular during the communist times.

References

Bancurile românilor ("The jokes of the Romanians") (in Romanian)

 
Ethnic humour